The Bunce School, near Allenspark, Colorado near the Continental Divide in Boulder County, Colorado, is a historic one-room schoolhouse built in 1888.  It was listed on the National Register of Historic Places in 1986.

It is a  log building built upon stone piers.  It was built by V.H. Rowley and J.H. Bunce.

When listed, it was one of only two surviving log rural schoolhouses in Boulder County. In 2013, it was asserted to be the only surviving log schoolhouse in the county.

A second contributing building on the property is an outhouse.

See also
National Register of Historic Places listings in Boulder County, Colorado

References

National Register of Historic Places in Boulder County, Colorado
School buildings completed in 1888
School buildings on the National Register of Historic Places in Colorado
Schools in Colorado
Log buildings and structures in Colorado
One-room schoolhouses in Colorado